Chapin Rose (born December 17, 1973) is a Republican member of the Illinois Senate, representing the 51st district since January 2013. The 51st district includes all or parts of McLean, DeWitt, Macon, Piatt, Shelby, Moultrie, Douglas, Champaign, Vermillion, and Edgar counties in Central Illinois.

He previously served in the Illinois House of Representatives, representing the 110th district from 2003 to 2013.

Illinois House of Representatives
After the 2001 deccenial reapportionment the 110th district was drawn without an incumbent legislator. The "new" district was composed of all of Coles, Douglas, and Piatt counties and portions of Champaign and Edgar counties. Rose won the 2002 Republican primary defeating Lynda Fishel, the former Mayor of Arcola; Ronald Hunt, the Mayor of Villa Grove; and Gerald Smith, a retired U.S. Army Corps of Engineers officer. In the staunchly Republican district, Rose defeated Democratic candidate John Hayden by a two-to-one margin.

During the 2008 Republican Party presidential primaries, Rose endorsed the presidential campaign of Rudy Giuliani. In 2009, Rose introduced legislative resolutions to overhaul the trustee selection process at the University of Illinois and demanded additional audits of IllinoisVENTURES after the state auditor found legal violations in a previous investigation.

Illinois Senate
During the 2011 decennial redistricting process, the 51st district was drawn without an incumbent while Rose was drawn into the same House district as fellow Republican Bill Mitchell. Rose opted to run for the "newly" created 51st Senate district while Mitchell ran for re-election in the House. In the 2012 election, Rose defeated Tom Pliura in the Republican primary and ran unopposed in the general election.

Rose currently serves on the following committees: Appropriations (Minority Spokesperson); Labor (Minority Spokesperson); Higher Education; Licensed Activities; Transportation; Insurance; App- Business Regulations and Labor; App-Education (Sub-Minority Spokesperson); App- Higher Education (Sub-Minority Spokesperson); App-Judiciary; Redistricting- E Central & SE IL; Licensed Activities- Special Issues.

Republican Party activism
Rose was an alternate to the 2000 Republican National Convention in Philadelphia. Rose served as an Illinois Co-Chair for the 2016 presidential campaign of Senator Ted Cruz. In 2018, Rose defeated Robert Winchester in the election for State Central Committeeman from Illinois's 15th congressional district for the Illinois Republican Party.

References

External links
 Biography, bills and committees at the 101st Illinois General Assembly
 By session: 101st, 100th,99th, 98th, 97th, 96th, 95th, 94th, 93rd
 State Senator Chapin Rose constituency website
 Chapin Rose for State Senator
 
 
 Profile at the Illinois House Republican Caucus

Republican Party members of the Illinois House of Representatives
1973 births
Living people
University of Illinois alumni
21st-century American politicians
University of Illinois College of Law alumni